Garawa may refer to:
Garawa, Kermanshah, Iran
Garawa, Kurdistan, Iran
Garrwa, people and language in Australia